To Drink the Rainbow (An Anthology 1988–2019) is a compilation album by the British singer-songwriter Tanita Tikaram, which was released by Needle Mythology in 2019.

Background
To Drink the Rainbow was curated by Peter Paphides, the founder of Needle Mythology, with assistance from Tikaram. As a fan of Tikaram's work, Paphides wanted to compile a compilation that focused on her later, post-teenage work. As a result, tracks from Tikaram's first two albums, Ancient Heart (1988) and The Sweet Keeper (1990) are omitted, although an acoustic version of "Valentine Heart" is included as a bonus track. Tracks from Lovers in the City were also omitted.

The compilation was released on CD and vinyl LP, with the latter being limited edition, containing a two-track seven-inch EP, a signed lyric sheet and postcard.

Critical reception
In a 2019 retrospective on the top 100 reissues, soundtracks and compilations of the year, The Quietus listed To Drink the Rainbow at number 80.

Track listing

Personnel
 Tanita Tikaram - liner notes
 Pete Paphides - curator, sleeve notes
 James at schein.co.uk - design
 Natacha Horn - photography

Production
 Mark Creswell - producer (tracks 1, 10, 14)
 Tanita Tikaram - producer (tracks 2, 4, 5, 8, 12)
 Neil Brockbank - producer (tracks 2, 8, 12)
 Angie Pollock, Goetz Botzenhardt - producers (tracks 3, 7)
 Peter Van Hooke, Rod Argent - producers (track 4)
 Charlie Mallozzi, Marco Sabiu - producers (tracks 6, 9)
 Paul Bryan - producer (tracks 11, 13)
 Miles Showell - mastering, remastering

Charts

References

2019 compilation albums
Tanita Tikaram albums